AURIGA (Antenna Ultracriogenica Risonante per l'Indagine Gravitazionale Astronomica) is an ultracryogenic resonant bar gravitational wave detector in Italy. It is at the Laboratori Nazionali di Legnaro of the Istituto Nazionale di Fisica Nucleare, near Padova. It is being used for research into gravitational waves and quantum gravity.

When the oscillator gets hit with a burst of gravitational waves, it will excite the oscillator and it will vibrate for a time span longer than the duration of the gravitational wave burst. This allows for the extraction of the signal from the detector.

See also 
 LIGO
 Weber bar

References 

Astronomical observatories in Italy
Gravitational-wave telescopes